In the 2020–21 season, Al-Duhail is competing in the Qatar Stars League for the 10th season, as well as the Emir of Qatar Cup and the Champions League.

Squad list
Players and squad numbers last updated on 3 September 2021.Note: Flags indicate national team as has been defined under FIFA eligibility rules. Players may hold more than one non-FIFA nationality.

Competitions

Overview

{| class="wikitable" style="text-align: center"
|-
!rowspan=2|Competition
!colspan=8|Record
!rowspan=2|Started round
!rowspan=2|Final position / round
!rowspan=2|First match	
!rowspan=2|Last match
|-
!
!
!
!
!
!
!
!
|-
| Qatar Stars League

| Matchday 1
| style="background:silver;"| Runners–up
| 3 September 2020
| 9 April 2021
|-
| 2020 Emir of Qatar Cup

| colspan=2| Semi-finals
| colspan=2| 31 October 2020
|-
| 2021 Emir of Qatar Cup

| Round of 16
| Semi-finals
| 25 January 2021
| 10 May 2021
|-
| Qatar Crown Prince Cup

| Semi-finals
| style="background:silver;"| Runners–up
| 18 February 2021
| 26 February 2021
|-
| 2020 Champions League

| colspan=2| Group stage
| 15 September 2020
| 24 September 2020
|-
| 2021 Champions League

| colspan=2| Group stage
| 15 April 2021
| 30 April 2021
|-
| FIFA Club World Cup

| First round
| Fifth place
| 1 February 2021
| 7 February 2021
|-
! Total

Qatar Stars League

League table

Results summary

Results by round

Matches

2020 Emir of Qatar Cup

2021 Emir of Qatar Cup

Qatar Cup (ex) Crown Prince Cup

FIFA Club World Cup

2020 AFC Champions League

Group stage

Group C

2021 AFC Champions League

Group stage

On 11 March 2021, AFC confirmed Thailand as the hosts for the group stage, except for Group H and I.

Group C

Squad information

Playing statistics

|-
! colspan=16 style=background:#dcdcdc; text-align:center| Goalkeepers

|-
! colspan=16 style=background:#dcdcdc; text-align:center| Defenders

|-
! colspan=16 style=background:#dcdcdc; text-align:center| Midfielders

|-
! colspan=16 style=background:#dcdcdc; text-align:center| Forwards

|-
! colspan=16 style=background:#dcdcdc; text-align:center| Players transferred out during the season

Goalscorers
Includes all competitive matches. The list is sorted alphabetically by surname when total goals are equal.

Assists

Transfers

In

Out

Notes

References

Al-Duhail SC seasons
Qatari football clubs 2020–21 season